Ricky Allan Siglar (born June 14, 1966) is a former American football offensive tackle who played for four teams in the NFL.  He played college football at San Jose State University and junior college football at Arizona Western College.

References

1966 births
Living people
Players of American football from Albuquerque, New Mexico
American football offensive tackles
Arizona Western Matadors football players
San Francisco 49ers players
Kansas City Chiefs players
New Orleans Saints players
Carolina Panthers players
San Jose State Spartans football players